This was the first edition of the tournament.

Andrea Collarini and Renzo Olivo won the title after defeating Diego Hidalgo and Cristian Rodríguez 6–4, 6–4 in the final.

Seeds

Draw

References

External links
 Main draw

Challenger del Biobío - Doubles